Face Up is the fifth album by British singer Lisa Stansfield, released by Arista Records on 20 June 2001. It was her first new studio album since 1997's Lisa Stansfield. Stansfield co-wrote songs for the album with her husband Ian Devaney and Richard Darbyshire. Devaney also produced all the tracks. Face Up garnered favorable reviews from music critics who praised the funky and soul songs and also the adventurous usage of 2-step garage beats in the first single, "Let's Just Call It Love". The disco-flavored "8-3-1", selected as the second single, was withdrawn at the last minute. Face Up was released in Europe and Japan, and performed moderately on the charts reaching top forty in the European countries. Face Up was re-released as a deluxe 2CD + DVD set in the United Kingdom on 10 November 2014 and in Europe on 21 November 2014.

Background
Lisa Stansfield released Face Up in June 2001, four years after her previous studio album, Lisa Stansfield. In the meantime, she starred in the musical comedy Swing (1999) and also recorded ten songs for the Swing: Original Motion Picture Soundtrack. In 1999, Stansfield recorded "The Longer We Make Love", duet with Barry White, included on his album, Staying Power, and in 2000, she recorded "You Keep Me Hangin' On" for the Motown Mania compilation. Face Up was Stansfield's last studio album released by Arista Records.

Content
Face Up was recorded in 2001. "We really enjoyed making that album," Stansfield said. "I was feeling good and I was very positive about everything. And that definitely comes out in the mood of the album." She co-wrote most songs with her husband Ian Devaney and Richard Darbyshire from the 80's band Living in a Box. Devaney also produced the entire album. "You Can Do That" and "When the Last Sun Goes Down" were co-written by Frank Musker, and "8-3-1" and "Can't Wait to" were co-written by Charlotte Kelly. "Boyfriend" was written by Stansfield and Devaney alone. The title track contains a sample from "First Come, First Serve" by Ramon Morris, and "8-3-1" starts off with a classic cinema line from Audrey Hepburn, "Oh I love you." On Face Up, Stansfield showcases her approach to classic funk and soul music and also tries out the contemporary urban beats of modern R&B. The album was released with thirteen songs in Europe and fourteen in the United Kingdom, including "All over Me." The Japanese edition included two bonus tracks: remix of "Let's Just Call It Love" and "Can't Wait To". In 2003, the album was remastered and re-released as limited edition digipak with "All over Me" and two other bonus songs: "Can't Wait To" and "You Get Me" (from the 1997 single "Don't Cry for Me"). Four songs were performed during Stansfield's concert at Ronnie Scott's Jazz Club which was released on DVD in 2005 titled simply Live at Ronnie Scott's.

Face Up was remastered and expanded, and was re-released as a deluxe 2CD + DVD set in November 2014. It was expanded to feature rare tracks and 12" mixes including 2003 remixes of "All Around the World", plus videos, live footage and a specially recorded interview with Stansfield. The twenty-eight-page booklet features photos, memorabilia, lyrics and brand new sleeve notes. The set was issued in the United Kingdom on 10 November 2014 and in Europe on 21 November 2014. It was also released as a part of The Collection 1989–2003 at the same time. The previously unreleased tracks on the 2014 reissue of Face Up include: "I've Got Something Better" (Trackmasters Remix), and three remixes of "8-3-1" by David Morales (Morales Radio Mix, Morales Alternative Club Mix and Morales Dub). Additionally, People Hold On ... The Remix Anthology features a previously unreleased remix of "Let's Just Call It Love" called the Feel It Mix by Ian Devaney.

Singles
The first single, "Let's Just Call It Love" was issued in Europe on 11 June 2001. It included club remixes and one new track, "More Than Sex". An accompanying music video, directed by Howard Greenhalgh, was also released. "Let's Just Call It Love" peaked at number forty-eight in the United Kingdom. Later, Arista Records created CD singles for "8-3-1" and set the European release date for 17 September 2001. However, the single, which included previously unreleased track "Can't Wait To", was withdrawn at the last minute. In 2003, "Let's Just Call It Love" and "8-3-1" remixed by David Morales were included on Biography: The Greatest Hits. In the United States, Arista earmarked "I've Got Something Better" as the likely lead single, and commissioned a hip-hop remix from Trackmasters. However, after the modest commercial performance of Face Up elsewhere, these plans were abandoned. This Trackmasters remix of "I've Got Something Better", and other previously unreleased tracks (remixes of "8-3-1" and "Let's Just Call It Love") were included in 2014 on The Collection 1989–2003, Face Up 2CD + DVD set and People Hold On ... The Remix Anthology.

Critical reception

Face Up received positive reviews from music critics. According to Jose F. Promis from AllMusic, this album is similar to Lisa Stansfield, except for a few more adventurous tracks. "'Let's Just Call It Love' incorporates the British 2-step garage beats which makes it an unusual but interesting leadoff single. [...] The album's opener, 'I've Got Something Better,' is classic, funky Lisa Stansfield at her best, and the song gets more and more fun with each repeated listening. Other standouts include the Burt Bacharach-ish show-stopping ballad 'How Could You?,' the pleading 'Don't Leave Now I'm in Love,' and the set's most obvious hit, the breezy, disco-laced anthem '8-3-1.' The title track is the album's requisite Barry White tribute, and the album's irresistibly funky closer, 'All Over Me,' is this set's answer to "The Line" from 1997." Promis also praised two ballads: the "gritty" "Didn't I" and the "sensitive and acoustic" "Wish on Me". He also called Face Up a "high-quality set". According to the Huddersfield Daily Examiner, the album is a "fine mix of uplifting dance, sugar-coated harmonies, strings, brass and songwriting that's as strong as ever. The top track is '8-3-1.'" The newspaper also wrote that "this is Stansfield at her best, who said herself: 'I think it is only fair to put a record out once you have a great collection of songs together, which is exactly what I feel about Face Up.'"

Commercial performance
In Europe, the album reached number nineteen in Switzerland, number twenty-six in Austria, number twenty-nine in Germany and number thirty-seven in Italy. In the United Kingdom "Face Up" peaked at number thirty-eight.

Track listing

Personnel
Credits taken from AllMusic.

Richie Buckley - saxophone, horn arrangement
Brian Byrne - orchestra conductor, string arrangement, piano
Richard Darbyshire - arranger, guitar, background vocals
Ian Devaney - producer, arranger, string arrangement, horn arrangement, mix, keyboards, guitar, programming
Shay Dooher - technical assistant
Emma Jane Lennon - assistant engineer
Kieron Lynch - assistant engineer
Stephen McDonnell - trumpet
Aidan McGovern - engineer, mix
Joanne Morris - digipak design
Eva Mueller - photography
Carl Ronan - trombone
Jimmy Smyth - acoustic guitar
Lisa Stansfield - lead vocals, background vocals, arranger
Stylorouge - art direction and original package design
The Irish Film Orchestra - strings
Caitriona Walsh - orchestral management
Tim Young - mastering

Charts

Release history

References

Lisa Stansfield albums
2001 albums